Viscount Lanesborough is a title that has been created twice in the Peerage of Ireland. The first creation came on 31 July 1676 in favour Sir George Lane, 2nd Baronet. The titles became extinct upon the death of his son, the second Viscount, on 2 August 1724. The Lane Baronetcy, of Tulske in the County of Roscommon, had been created in the Baronetage of Ireland on 9 February 1661 for Richard Lane. The second creation came on 12 August 1728 in favour Brinsley Butler, 2nd Baron Newtown-Butler. His son Humphrey was created Earl of Lanesborough in 1756. See the latter title for more information on this creation.

The Honourable Frances Lane, daughter of the first Viscount of the first creation, married  as her second husband Henry Fox. Their son George Fox-Lane, 1st Baron Bingley assumed the additional surname of Lane and was created Baron Bingley in 1762.

Lane Baronets, of Tulske (1661)
Sir Richard Lane, 1st Baronet (died 1668) 
Sir George Lane, 2nd Baronet (–1683) (created Viscount Lanesborough in 1676)

Viscount Lanesborough (1676; First creation)
George Lane, 1st Viscount Lanesborough (–1683)
James Lane, 2nd Viscount Lanesborough (1650–1724)

Viscount Lanesborough (1728; Second creation)
see Earl of Lanesborough

References

External links 

Extinct viscountcies in the Peerage of Ireland
1661 establishments in Ireland
Noble titles created in 1676
Noble titles created in 1728